Charles-Séraphin Rodier (October 6, 1818 – January 26, 1890) was a Canadian businessman and politician.

Born in Montreal, Lower Canada, the son of Jean-Baptiste Rodier and Marie-Desanges Sedillot dit Montreuil, Rodier was the nephew of Charles-Séraphin Rodier, a mayor of Montreal. Rodier would later use the suffix "Jr" to his name to tell himself apart from his uncle. Rodier started working at age fourteen as a carpenter and after as a building contractor. He later started a factory to make agricultural tools for farmers. He used to demand mortgages in return for the tools and as a result accumulated a large amount of land in the Montreal area.

In 1861, he co-founded the Banque Jacques-Cartier and was a director until 1870. He was also a vice-president from 1870 to 1876. From 1847 to 1850, he was a member of the Montreal City Council for the ward of Saint-Antoine. A supported of the federal Conservative Party, Rodier was called to the Senate of Canada for the senatorial division of Mille Isles on the advice of Prime Minister John A. Macdonald in 1888. He served until his death in 1890.

He was president of the Saint-Jean-Baptiste Society of Montreal. In 1869, he help form the 64th Châteauguay and Beauharnois Regiment (Voltigeurs Canadiens of Beauharnois), becoming its first lieutenant-colonel.

References
 
 

1818 births
1890 deaths
Canadian senators from Quebec
Conservative Party of Canada (1867–1942) senators
Montreal city councillors
Burials at Notre Dame des Neiges Cemetery